The Minakshisundaram–Pleijel zeta function is a zeta function encoding the eigenvalues of the Laplacian of a compact Riemannian manifold.

Definition

For a compact Riemannian manifold M of dimension N with eigenvalues 
  of the Laplace–Beltrami operator , the zeta function is given for  sufficiently large by

(where if an eigenvalue is zero it is omitted in the sum). The manifold may have a boundary, in which case one has to prescribe suitable boundary conditions, such as Dirichlet or Neumann boundary conditions.

More generally one can define

If N is even, the residues at the poles can be explicitly found in terms of the metric, and by the Wiener–Ikehara theorem we find as a corollary the relation

,

 
.

Heat kernel

The analytic continuation of the zeta function can be found by expressing it in terms of the heat kernel 

as the Mellin transform

In particular, we have 

where 

is the trace of the heat kernel.

The poles of the zeta function can be found from the asymptotic behavior of the heat kernel as t→0.

Example

If the manifold is a circle of dimension N=1, then the eigenvalues of the Laplacian are n2 for integers n. The zeta function

where ζ is the Riemann zeta function.

Applications

Apply the method of heat kernel to asymptotic expansion for Riemannian manifold (M,g) we obtain the two following theorems. Both are the resolutions of the inverse problem in which we get the geometric properties or quantities from spectra of the operators. 

1) Minakshisundaram–Pleijel Asymptotic Expansion

Let (M,g) be an n-dimensional Riemannian manifold. Then, as t→0+, the trace of the heat kernel has an asymptotic expansion of the form:

In dim=2, this means that the integral of scalar curvature tells us the Euler characteristic of M, by the Gauss–Bonnet theorem.

In particular, 

where S(x) is scalar curvature, the trace of the Ricci curvature, on M.

2) Weyl Asymptotic Formula
Let M be a compact Riemannian manifold, with eigenvalues

with each distinct eigenvalue repeated with its multiplicity. Then

This is also called Weyl's law, refined from the Minakshisundaram–Pleijel asymptotic expansion.

References

Harmonic analysis
Differential geometry
Zeta and L-functions